Gbassay Bangura (January 30, 1974 – December 24, 2009) was a Sierra Leonean football defender. He was a squad member for the 1996 African Cup of Nations. Gbassay Bangura died in December 2009 of ALS.

References

1974 births
Living people
Sierra Leonean footballers
Sierra Leone international footballers
Spånga IS players
AFC Eskilstuna players
Degerfors IF players
IF Elfsborg players
Association football defenders
Sierra Leonean expatriate footballers
Expatriate footballers in Sweden
Sierra Leonean expatriate sportspeople in Sweden
Allsvenskan players
1996 African Cup of Nations players